The Kalungwishi River flows west in northern Zambia into Lake Mweru. It is known for its waterfalls, including the Lumangwe Falls, Kabweluma Falls, Kundabwika Falls and Mumbuluma Falls.

There are plans to build two hydro power plants on the Kundabwika and kabwelume falls. This has not pleased everyone as some feel the beauty of the water falls will be disturbed.

The Kalungwishi pontoon on the Kawambwa-Mporokoso road above Lumangwe Falls was replaced by a new bridge in 2004.

Location

References 

Rivers of Zambia
Lake Mweru